Timothy Walker is a British botanist. He was the Horti Praefectus (Director) of the University of Oxford Botanic Garden and Harcourt Arboretum.

Biography
After attending Abingdon School from 1971 to 1976 Walker studied for a BA degree in Botany at University College, Oxford from 1977 to 1980. From 1980 to 1982, he was a trainee gardener at the Oxford Botanic Garden. He studied for a National Certificate in Horticulture at Askham Bryan College in North Yorkshire during 1982–83. Then during 1983–84 he was a trainee gardener at the Savill Garden in Windsor Great Park. He was a diploma student at Kew Gardens during 1984–85.

From 1986 to 1988 he was General Foreman at the Oxford Botanic Garden then from 1988 to 2014 he was Horti Praefectus of the Garden. He also holds a lectureship in Plant Conservation at Somerville College, Oxford and is a lecturer in biology at the Department of Biology, University of Oxford. He has won four gold medals at the Chelsea Flower Show in London.

In June 2011, Walker presented Botany – A Blooming History, a series of three television programmes broadcast on BBC Four, covering the history of botany. The series was repeated, again on BBC4, in August 2022.

Publications

Books

See also
 List of Old Abingdonians

References

External links 
  Department of Plant Sciences home page
 Somerville College home page
 www.timothywalker.org.uk

Living people
Alumni of University College, Oxford
Fellows of Somerville College, Oxford
British botanists
BBC television presenters
1958 births